Ahmat Tursunjan (born 9 July 2000) is a Chinese footballer currently playing as a midfielder for Xinjiang Tianshan Leopard, on loan from Hubei Istar.

Career statistics

Club
.

References

2000 births
Living people
Chinese footballers
Association football midfielders
China League Two players
Chinese Super League players
Henan Songshan Longmen F.C. players